Lauchheim is a town in the Ostalbkreis district, in Baden-Württemberg, Germany. It is situated on the river Jagst, 12 km northeast of Aalen.

References

Ostalbkreis
Württemberg